Lentidium mediterraneum is a species of clam in the family Corbulidae.

References

Corbulidae
Molluscs described in 1830